The shortdorsal cutthroat eel (Synaphobranchus brevidorsalis, also known commonly as the shortfin cut-throat eel) is an eel in the family Synaphobranchidae (cutthroat eels). It was described by Albert Günther in 1887. It is a marine, deep water-dwelling eel which is known from the Indo-Pacific and western central Atlantic Ocean, including Zanzibar, Maldives, Australia, Japan, Suriname, and the Gulf of Mexico.

References

Synaphobranchidae
Fish described in 1887
Taxa named by Albert Günther